United Nations Security Council Resolution 2049 was unanimously adopted on 7 June 2012.

See also 
List of United Nations Security Council Resolutions 2001 to 2100

References

External links
Text of the Resolution at undocs.org

 2048
2012 in Iran
 2049
June 2012 events